The 1997 Supercopa Libertadores was the tenth and final season of the Supercopa Libertadores, a club football tournament for past Copa Libertadores winners. 

Vasco da Gama were admitted to the tournament for the first time in recognition of winning the South American Championship of Champions in 1948. Argentinos Juniors did not take part. River Plate won the competition for the first time, defeating São Paulo 2–1 on aggregate in the final.

For its final season, the format of the first round was changed from a two-legged knockout round to four groups of four teams playing each other twice. As 17 teams were scheduled to take part, a preliminary round was played to eliminate one team.

As through the successive editions of this cup were added new champions from the Copa Libertadores, in 1997 the Conmebol decided that the last teams of each group would descend to reduce the number of teams to disputed it. That year descended Velez Sarsfield, Racing Club and Boca Juniors (all teams from Argentina) and Gremio (Brazil).

Teams

;Notes

Preliminary round
The matches were played from 15 June to 13 July.

Group stage
The matches were played from 26 August to 30 October.

Group 1

Group 2

Group 3

Group 4

Knockout phase
In the knockout phase, the four group winners played a single-elimination tournament. Each tie was played on a home-and-away two-legged basis.

Bracket

Semifinals
The matches were played on 5 November, 6 November, 26 November and 27 November.

Finals

The matches were played on 5 November, 6 November, 26 November and 27 November.

River Plate won 2–1 on aggregate.

Top goalscorers

See also
List of Copa Libertadores winners
1997 Copa Libertadores
1998 Recopa Sudamericana

External links
RSSSF

Supercopa Libertadores
2